Vivian is a census-designated place (CDP) in McDowell County, West Virginia, United States. As of the 2010 census, its population was 82.

An old variant name was Clausen. The Peerless Coal Company Store was listed on the National Register of Historic Places in 1992.

References

Census-designated places in McDowell County, West Virginia
Census-designated places in West Virginia
Coal towns in West Virginia